Andrei Mukhachyov (born 21 July 1980) is a Russian former professional ice hockey defenceman. He was selected by the Nashville Predators in the 7th round (210th overall) of the 2003 NHL Entry Draft.

Mukhachyov played in the Russian Superleague and the Kontinental Hockey League for HC CSKA Moscow, Vityaz Chekhov, HC Atlant Moscow Oblast, Ak Bars Kazan, Avangard Omsk, Amur Khabarovsk and Traktor Chelyabinsk. He also suited up for Bulgarian team HC CSKA Sofia for the IIHF Continental Cup in 2013 and 2014.

Career statistics

Regular season and playoffs

International

References

External links

1980 births
Ak Bars Kazan players
Amur Khabarovsk players
Avangard Omsk players
Atlant Moscow Oblast players
Bulgarian Hockey League players
HC CSKA Moscow players
HC Vityaz players
Living people
Nashville Predators draft picks
Russian ice hockey defencemen
Sportspeople from Yekaterinburg
Traktor Chelyabinsk players